Rodessa is a village in Caddo Parish, Louisiana, United States. The population was 270 at the 2010 census. It is part of the Shreveport–Bossier City Metropolitan Statistical Area.

Geography
Rodessa is located in northwestern Caddo Parish at  (32.971486, -93.995941). It is the incorporated place in Louisiana closest to the state's northwest corner. Louisiana Highway 1 passes through the village, leading south  to Vivian and northwest  to Atlanta, Texas (as Texas State Highway 77).

Demographics

As of the census of 2000, there were 307 people, 119 households, and 81 families residing in the village. The racial makeup of the village was 70.36% White, 27.69% African American, 1.63% Native American, and 0.33% from two or more races. Hispanic or Latino of any race were 0.33% of the population.

There were 119 households, out of which 36.1% had children under the age of 18 living with them, 48.7% were married couples living together, 14.3% had a female householder with no husband present, and 31.9% were non-families. 28.6% of all households were made up of individuals, and 17.6% had someone living alone who was 65 years of age or older. The average household size was 2.58 and the average family size was 3.17.

In the village, the population was spread out, with 31.6% under the age of 18, 8.5% from 18 to 24, 28.7% from 25 to 44, 17.9% from 45 to 64, and 13.4% who were 65 years of age or older. The median age was 31 years. For every 100 females, there were 108.8 males. For every 100 females age 18 and over, there were 100.0 males.

The median income for a household in the village was $21,750, and the median income for a family was $28,125. Males had a median income of $31,750 versus $13,977 for females. The per capita income for the village was $10,693. About 22.0% of families and 24.6% of the population were below the poverty line, including 34.8% of those under the age of eighteen and 11.6% of those 65 or over.

A majority of Rodessa's population identifies with the Christian Faith with zero Muslims and only one Jewish adult.

Notable person
Dan Flores, historian of the American West

References

Villages in Louisiana
Villages in Caddo Parish, Louisiana
Villages in Shreveport – Bossier City metropolitan area